Paraphthonia  is a genus in the butterfly family Riodinidae present only in the Neotropical realm.

Species

Paraphthonia cteatus Seitz, 1917 present in Peru.
Paraphthonia molione (Godman, 1903) present in Peru.

Sources 
Paraphthonia sur funet

External links

Paraphthonia at butterflies of america

Riodinidae
Butterfly genera
Taxa named by Hans Ferdinand Emil Julius Stichel